Robert, Bob or Rob May may refer to:

 Robert May (cook) (1588 – c. 1664), English chef
 Robert May (producer) American filmmaker, producer and director
 Robert May, founder in 1694 of Robert May's School, Odiham, Hampshire, England
 Robert G. May, American academic administrator
 Robert H. May (1822–1903), mayor of Augusta, Georgia
 Robert L. May (1905–1976), creator of Rudolph the Red-Nosed Reindeer
 Robert P. May, interim CEO of HealthSouth Corporation
 Robert May, Baron May of Oxford (1936–2020), Australian biologist
 Bob May (actor) (1939–2009), American actor
 Bob May (golfer) (born 1968), American professional golfer
 Bob May (ice hockey) (1927–2014), Canadian ice hockey player and coach
 Bob May (politician) (1909–1986), Australian politician
 Rob May (born 1969), English musician